The Vine Awards for Canadian Jewish Literature is a major Canadian literary award relaunched in 2016 and presented annually by Toronto's Koffler Centre of the Arts. The Awards honour the best Jewish Canadian writing in four categories, each with an annual prize of $10,000: Fiction, Non-Fiction, Young Adult and Children's literature, and History. A fifth $10,000 prize for Poetry is awarded every three years. 

The Awards consider submissions from both print and digital sources (including books, e-books, graphic novels, digital storytelling, and a variety of media). Writers must be Canadian or the submission must have significant Canadian content. Writers must be Jewish or the submission must have significant or predominantly Jewish content.

A professional jury of three individuals working in the arts and media oversee the award selection process. The shortlist for the inaugural Vine Awards for Canadian Jewish Literature was announced on September 15, 2016. The winners were announced on September 29, 2016.

History 
The original Canadian Jewish Book Awards were founded in 1988 by Adam Fuerstenberg. 

In 1994, the Koffler Centre of the Arts took over the Awards management. From 2004 to 2014 – with the support of a donation from Lillian and Norman Glowinsky – the Awards were renamed the Helen and Stan Vine Canadian Jewish Book Awards. 

In 2015, the Koffler Centre of the Arts put the Awards on hiatus for one year to reframe the program. The resulting Vine Awards for Canadian Jewish Literature continues Fuerstenberg's original ambition, "bringing increased awareness of the Canadian Jewish canon to the public, as well as supporting and celebrating Canadian books and writers."

The Vine Awards for Canadian Jewish Literature are supported by a donation by the Lillian and Norman Glowinsky Family Foundation.

List of winners and shortlists of the Vine Awards for Canadian Jewish Literature

See also 

 Canadian Jewish Book Award
 List of winners of the National Jewish Book Award
 National Jewish Book Award

References

External links 
 Vine Awards for Canadian Jewish Literature
 Koffler Centre of the Arts

Canadian literary awards
Jewish Canadian literature
Jewish literary awards